Eupagopteryx is a genus of moths in the family Lasiocampidae. The genus was first described by Yves de Lajonquière in 1972.

Species
Eupagopteryx affinis Aurivillius, 1909
Eupagopteryx albolunatus Kenrick, 1914
Eupagopteryx songeana Strand, 1913

References

Lasiocampidae